Monte Sillara is the highest peak in the Appennino Parmense, a sub-chain of the northern Apennines (Appennino Tosco-Emilano) in the province of Parma, northern Italy. It has an altitude of 1,861 m.  The Sillara is located at the boundary of the provinces of Parma and Massa-Carrara, divided between the comuni of Monchio delle Corti (northern slopes) and Bagnone (southern ones).

On the Parmense side are two small glacial lakes, the Lake Sillara Superiore (11,400 sq. m, at 1,732 m) and the Lake Sillara Inferiore (11,350 sq. m, at 1,731 m). The source of the Bagnone torrent, a left affluence of the Magra River, can be found on the southern Sillara.

Mountains of the Apennines
Mountains of Emilia-Romagna
Mountains of Tuscany
One-thousanders of Italy